Yesipov is a surname. Notable people with the surname include:

Valery Yesipov (born 1971), Soviet footballer
Valery Yesipov (born 1950), Russian historian and Shalamov scholar, who lives in Vologda
Vladimir Yesipov, Russian conductor

See also
Andrei Esipov (born 1980), Russian ice hockey player